The Deep Creek Ranger Station in Bitterroot National Forest in Idaho County, Idaho was listed on the National Register of Historic Places.  It is in the vicinity of Darby, Montana.  It has also been known as Magruder Ranger Station.

It includes a complex of Rustic-style administrative buildings dating from the 1920s through 1940s.

References

Historic districts in Idaho
Park buildings and structures on the National Register of Historic Places in Idaho
Buildings and structures completed in 1935 
Idaho County, Idaho